John Herbert Inns (30 March 1876 – 14 June 1905) was an English cricketer.  Inns' batting and bowling styles are not known, but it is known he fielded on occasion as a wicket-keeper.  He was born at Writtle, Essex.

Inns made his first-class debut for Essex against Oxford University in 1898.  He played infrequently for Essex, making nine further first-class appearances, the last of which came against Middlesex in the 1904 County Championship.  In his ten first-class appearances, he scored 73 runs at an average of 6.63, with a high score of 28.  In the field he took 8 catches.

He died at Leyton, Essex on 14 June 1905 and was buried at Writtle.

References

External links
John Inns at ESPNcricinfo
John Inns at CricketArchive

1876 births
1905 deaths
People from Writtle
English cricketers
Essex cricketers